Orygocera is a genus of moths in the family Oecophoridae.

Species
Orygocera ambavaella Viette, 1988
Orygocera ampolomitella (Viette, 1958)
Orygocera anderesi Viette, 1991
Orygocera andilambella (Viette, 1985)
Orygocera aurea (Viette, 1954)
Orygocera befasyella Viette, 1988
Orygocera carnicolor Walsingham, 1897
Orygocera dubiosella (Viette, 1987)
Orygocera fosaella (Viette, 1958)
Orygocera griveaudella (Viette, 1985)
Orygocera indranoella (Viette, 1985)
Orygocera lemuriella (Viette, 1958)
Orygocera lenobapta Meyrick, 1924
Orygocera magdalena Meyrick, 1930
Orygocera marianka (Viette, 1987)
Orygocera minetorum (Viette, 1987)
Orygocera mokotraella (Viette, 1985)
Orygocera occidentella (Viette, 1967)
Orygocera pauliani 	(Viette, 1949)
Orygocera perinetella Viette, 1988
Orygocera propycnota Meyrick, 1930
Orygocera recordata Meyrick, 1921
Orygocera rungsella (Viette, 1956)
Orygocera rusetella Viette, 1988
Orygocera silvestriella 	(Viette, 1956)
Orygocera soaella (Viette, 1968)
Orygocera subnivea (Viette, 1954)
Orygocera tricolorella (Viette, 1958) 
Orygocera vadonella (Viette, 1985)

References
Walsingham, Thomas de Grey 1897a. Western Equatorial African Micro-Lepidoptera. - Transactions of the Entomological Society of London 1897(1):33–67, pls. 2–3.

 
Oecophorinae
Moth genera